Events from the year 1990 in the United Arab Emirates.

Incumbents
President: Zayed bin Sultan Al Nahyan 
Prime Minister: Rashid bin Saeed Al Maktoum (until 7 October), Maktoum bin Rashid Al Maktoum (starting 7 October)

Incumbents
Maktoum bin Rashid Al Maktoum became Prime Minister of the country.

References

 
Years of the 20th century in the United Arab Emirates
United Arab Emirates
United Arab Emirates
1990s in the United Arab Emirates